Clinidium alleni is a species of ground beetle in the subfamily Rhysodinae. It was described by R.T. & J.R. Bell in 1985. It is named for R. T. Allen, whose collection efforts have contributed to the understanding of beetle fauna in lower Central America. It is known from Cerro Jefe in Panama.

References

Clinidium
Beetles of Central America
Endemic fauna of Panama
Beetles described in 1985